The Panaro is an Italian river and the final right-hand tributary to the Po, discounting the Cavo Napoleonico canal.  It runs right across Emilia-Romagna in a north-easterly direction: from its source close to the Apennine watershed, where Emilia-Romagna meets Tuscany, to its outlet where the Po marks the region's boundary with Veneto. Its Latin name was Scultenna.

From here it flows down the valley in a northeastern direction. At Pievepelago (in the Province of Modena) it changes name to Scoltenna, assuming in the territory of Pavullo nel Frignano finally that of Panaro. In this area it makes up the border between the communities of Montana del Frignano and Montana dell’appennino Modena Est. Close to Modena, it joins the Naviglio de Modena and becomes navigable until its confluence with the Po, a little to the west of Ferrara. It runs through Vignola, Finale Emilia and Bondeno.

Of particular historical and artistic interest is the bridge of Olina, constructed in 1522, crossing the river close to the small town of the same name, in the commune of Pavullo nel Frignano

Rivers of Italy
Rivers of Emilia-Romagna
Rivers of the Province of Modena
Rivers of the Province of Ferrara
Rivers of the Apennines